Chill, Dummy (often stylized as Chill, dummy) is the fifth solo studio album by American rapper P.O.S. It was released on Doomtree Records on January 27, 2017. Guest appearances include Busdriver, Astronautalis, Open Mike Eagle, and Justin Vernon, among others. It peaked at number 16 on the Billboard Independent Albums chart.

Production
The album is produced by Lazerbeak, Makr, Cory Grindberg, Ryan Olson, and P.O.S himself. It also features Moncelas Boston, Rapper Hooks, Justin Vernon, Lady Midnight, Busdriver, Dwynell Roland, Gerald, Manchita, Open Mike Eagle, Angelenah, Allan Kingdom, Astronautalis, Eric Mayson, Hard_R (P.O.S's son), Kathleen Hanna, Lizzo, Lydia Liza, and Nicholas L. Perez.

Critical reception

At Metacritic, which assigns a weighted average score out of 100 to reviews from mainstream critics, the album received an average score of 83, based on 4 reviews, indicating "universal acclaim".

ABC News placed it at number 26 on the "50 Best Albums of 2017" list.

In popular culture
The song Born a Snake was used in Marvel’s Black Panther: A Nation Under Our Feet, in episode nine.

The song Gravedigger was used in EA's racing game Need for Speed Payback.

Track listing

Personnel
Credits adapted from liner notes.

 P.O.S – vocals, production (4, 6, 10, 12), recording
 Jeremy Ylvisaker – guitar (1)
 Gerald – vocals (1, 6)
 Lazerbeak – production (2, 7), executive production
 Moncelas Boston – vocals (3, 7)
 Rapper Hooks – vocals (3)
 Makr – production (3)
 Lady Midnight – vocals (4, 8, 9, 11)
 Dwynell Roland – vocals (5)
 Busdriver – vocals (5)
 Cory Grindberg – production (5, 8, 9, 11)
 Ryan Olson – production (7)
 Open Mike Eagle – vocals (9)
 Manchita – vocals (9)
 James Buckley – bass guitar (9, 11)
 Angelenah – vocals (11)
 DJ Abilities – turntables (11)
 Hard_R – vocals (12)
 Allan Kingdom – vocals (12)
 Astronautalis – vocals (12)
 Kathleen Hanna – vocals (12)
 Lizzo – vocals (12)
 Eric Mayson – vocals (12)
 Lydia Liza – vocals (12)
 Nicholas L. Perez – vocals (12)
 Joe Mabbott – drums (12), engineering, recording, mixing
 BJ Burton – recording (2), mixing (2)
 Bruce Templeton – mastering
 Brian Hart – photography, design
 Crystal Quinn – text

Charts

References

External links
 
 Chill, Dummy at Bandcamp

2017 albums
P.O.S albums
Doomtree Records albums
Albums produced by Lazerbeak